Global Justice may refer to:

Global justice, a concept
Global Justice (Kim Possible), a fictional organization
Global justice movement
Global Justice (organization)